The 2009 ITU World Championship Series was a series of seven triathlon events leading to a Grand Final held in Gold Coast, Queensland, Australia in September 2009. The series was organised under the auspices of the world governing body of triathlon – the International Triathlon Union (ITU) – and was sponsored by Dextro Energy. The 2009 World Championship Series (WCS) was the first year of a change in format replacing the single World Championship race of prior years. Additionally, points accumulated in 2009 ITU Triathlon World Cup events would contribute to an athlete's overall point total in the Championship Series.

Series events
The series featured on four continents in the inaugural year, stopping in some locations previously used as successful World Cup race destinations, as well as the first chance for athletes to try out the venue of the 2012 Olympic Triathlon at Hyde Park in London.

Prize purses
The prize purses offered to the top performers during the series were significantly greater than previous World Championship events, with a total of US$700,000 being distributed. Additionally $150,000 was distributed at each of the 2009 World Championship Events, and $250,000 at the Grand Final.

Results

Overall world championship
Points were distributed at each World Championship Event to the top 40 finishers in the men's and women's elite races, and to the top 50 finishers at the Grand Final. Points towards the ITU World Championship ranking could also be obtained at the World Cup events. The sum of each athlete's best four points scores in the World Championship and World Cup Events (maximum of two World Cup scores) and the points score from the World Championship Grand Final determined the final ranking.

Men's championship

Full ranking:

Women's championship

Full ranking:

Event medalists

Tongyeong
2–3 May 2009

Madrid
30–31 May 2009

Washington, DC
20–21 June 2009

Kitzbühel
11–12 July 2009

Hamburg
25–26 July 2009

London
15–16 August 2009

Yokohama
22–23 August 2009

Gold Coast – Grand Final
9–13 September 2009

References

External links
Dextro Energy Triathlon – ITU World Championship Series – Official website

World Triathlon Series
World Championships
ITU World Championship Series
Sports competitions on the Gold Coast, Queensland
International sports competitions hosted by Australia
Triathlon competitions in Australia